Taqiabad (also Romanized as Taqīābād) is a village in Sharifabad Rural District, Koshkuiyeh District, Rafsanjan County, Kerman Province, Iran. At the 2006 census, its population was 1,103, in 272 families.

References 

Populated places in Rafsanjan County